The Great Gulfcoast Arts Festival is an annual three-day, juried art show in historic Seville Square in downtown Pensacola, Florida. Established in 1973, this Festival is held the first full weekend in November. Annually, it draws over 200 painters, potters, sculptors, jewelers, graphic artists, craftsmen, mixed-media artists and others competing for $25,000 in cash awards.

There was no festival in 2004 nor 2020.

Generally
The Festival features a Heritage Arts area, where craftspeople from around the country provide demonstrations of crafts from the past, including blacksmithing, engraving, spinning, weaving and other time-honored traditions.

Live musicians are featured on two stages. The Pensacola Symphony and Pensacola Opera performances most years. Other performances range from bluegrass, Cajun and blues to instrumental guitar. The performing arts stage showcases theater, folk and ballet dance.

The Children's Arts Festival features numerous hands-on artistic opportunities for children at no cost to parents. Projects include face painting, clay play, a flower shop, button creations, sand art, sidewalk art, and a magical balloon show. There is glitter, glue, sequins and more for children to create their own mini-masterpieces such as masks, crowns, magic wands, and jewelry.

Bartram Park is also home to the annual Student Art Show, showcasing the talents of private and public school students in Escambia and Santa Rosa Counties. Over 2,000 pieces of art from elementary, middle and high school students is displayed.

Food and beverages are available from a variety of vendors, including area restaurants.

Admission to the festival is free.

Entries
Show entries are by juried selection, with artists' applications generally due in early May. Show entries compete for prizes at various levels, with a 2010 Best of Show award set at $3000. The yearly design competitions for selecting the official GGAF poster are also juried, generally in June, with a cash award of $1,000 in 2010.

See also
Art exhibition
Festivals

References

External links

Art exhibitions in the United States
Festivals in Florida
Culture of Pensacola, Florida
Tourist attractions in Pensacola, Florida
Festivals established in 1973
1973 establishments in Florida